Modern Gallery  (since 2021 the National Museum of Modern Art) is a museum in Zagreb, Croatia that holds the most important and comprehensive collection of paintings, sculptures and drawings by 19th and 20th century Croatian artists. The collection numbers around 10,000 works of art, housed since 1934 in the historic Vranyczany Palace in the centre of Zagreb, overlooking the Zrinjevac Park. A secondary gallery is the Josip Račić Studio at Margaretska 3.

History

The Modern Gallery, originally the National Gallery for Croatian Art, dates from the early 1900s, when it was founded by the Art Society with paintings and sculptures acquired by their members, including a donation from Bishop Josip Juraj Strossmayer.

In 1899, Izidor Kršnjavi, gave a presentation to the Art Society in Zagreb, with the idea of establishing the Gallery. His proposal was recorded in the Social Exhibitions Statute of 1901. In the spring of 1905, to mark the Society’s 30th anniversary, three works of art were bought for the future holdings of the Modern Gallery. That year, 1905, is considered to be the official date the Gallery was founded, due to the holdings which were put together at the time. However, the collection grew gradually and it was not open for public viewing until 1914, in a single room of today’s Museum of Arts and Crafts building, where it was available only to those who showed a special interest in it.

As the collection expanded, the Gallery moved to its current building, the Vranyczany Palace on Zrinjevac Park in 1934 and it has been there, with a pause during World War II, up until the present day. The Vranyczany Palace was designed by the Viennese architect Otto Hofer, and constructed in 1882 by Ferdo Kondrat for Baron Lujo Vranyczany. Since the end of 19th century the building has changed ownership frequently, and has been restored several times. Through the years, the Vranyczany building has entertained some well-known figures in Croatia's cultural, political and economic life. From its balcony in November 1884, Bishop Josip Juraj Strossmayer watched the celebrations organised in his honour on the occasion of the opening of the gallery named after him. The splendid receptions of the past have now been replaced by the contemplative atmosphere of Zagreb's gallery of modern art.

The Palace underwent a complete renovation between 1993 and 2005, when the current exhibition was opened to the public. Two floors of the palace have become a modern-equipped gallery showing the permanent collection of Croatian modern painting and sculpture. In the completely refurbished historic rooms, the Modern Gallery presents "Two Hundred Years of Croatian Fine Arts (1800-2000)", a representative selection of 650-700 of the best works by painters, sculptors and medal makers. The Modern Gallery has become the best known, and most complete Croatian modern art museum. Retrospectives and monographic exhibitions of works by the most prominent Croatian artists have been taking place there since the end of the 1960s, as well as theme exhibitions of Croatian and European modern art.

Collection

The Modern Gallery in Zagreb holds the richest and most important collection of Croatian art of the 19th and 20th centuries. Today the holding numbers around 10,000 works of art including paintings, sculptures, drawings and graphics, medallions and medals, as well as photographs and new media. More than 700 Croatian works of art belonging to the 19th and 20th century are on display. The exhibition extends across two floors of the Palace and the main staircase, displaying the works of individual artists, and also showing their place in the Croatian modern art scene and within modern Croatian society in general. According to Biserka Rauter Plančić, the current Director of the Modern Gallery, "The Gallery’s mission is to record, as much as possible, the events and changes in Croatian art which took place over the two centuries of building and breaking down the perception of the world, as well as the perception of workmanship."

In addition to its permanent collection, the Modern Gallery also holds special exhibits. In 2009, a multi-sensory Tactile Gallery MG, was opened to help vision-impaired visitors experience major Croatian modern paintings and sculptures through touch and sound. The Modern Gallery’s holdings continue to expand and once a year, a New Acquisitions exhibition is held.

A new multi-media exhibition entitled “Ikonografija grada u hrvatskom slikarstvu u prvoj polovici 20 st.“ (Iconography of Towns in Croatian Paintings from the First Half of the 20th Century), was opened to the public in April 2010. It presents the viewer with a motif of a town in paintings, drawing, graphics, art photography; on posters and film, and in literature and music. The exhibit covers over 150 artefacts including works of the most significant Croatian artists of the 20th century, from the Munich circle to socialism and the beginnings of the abstract art.

Artists represented in the permanent collection of the Modern Gallery include:

 Ljubo Babić
 Vojin Bakić
 Petar Barišić
 Ivo Deković
 Marijan Detoni
 Ivo Dulčić
 Dušan Džamonja
 Vladimir Becić
 F. Bilak
 Vlaho Bukovac
 Vladimir Gašparić Gapo
 Vilko Gecan
 Josip Generalić
 Oton Gliha
 Krsto Hegedušić
 Ljubo Ivančić
 Franz Jaschke
 Anto Jerković
 Vasilije Josip Jordan
 Leo Junek
 Vjekoslav Karas
 Ivo Kerdić
 Zlatko Keser
 Josip Klarica
 Slavko Kopač
 Kuzma Kovačić
 Miroslav Kraljević
 Frano Kršinić
 Vatroslav Kuliš
 Ferdinand Kulmer
 Ivan Lesjak
 Tihomir Lončar
 Nikola Mašić
 Ivan Meštrović
 Matko Mijić
 Karlo Mijić
 Robert Frangeš Mihanović
 Jerolim Miše
 Antun Motika
 Edo Murtić
 Sofija Naletilić Penavuša
 Zoltan Novak
 Mladen Pejaković
 Ivan Picelj
 Dimitrije Popović
 Zlatko Prica
 Ferdo Quiquerez
 Mirko Racki
 Josip Račić
 Slava Raškaj
 Ivan Rendić
 Ivo Režek
 Branko Ružić
 Đuro Seder
 Miljenko Stančić
 Milan Steiner
 Dalibor Stošić
 Mihael Stroy
 Gabrijel Stupica
 Ivo Šebalj
 Zlatko Šulentić
 Marino Tartaglia
 Marija Ujević
 Milivoj Uzelac
 Vladimir Varlaj
 Emanuel Vidović
 Zlatan Vrkljan
 Josip Zanki
 Ivan Zasche

In addition to the permanent display, occasional exhibitions of local and foreign artists are also held. For example, from December 2008 to March 2009, the first complete retrospective of Josip Račić's works was on display on the first floor of the gallery; Račić is one of the most important representatives of Croatian Modernist painting.

The gallery publishes monographs on artists and their works in a catalogue series called Modern Croatian Art, and in other publications.

See also
Museum of Contemporary Art, Zagreb
The Strossmayer Gallery of Old Masters, Zagreb
Croatian Museum of Naïve Art, Zagreb
Art Pavilion, Zagreb
Museum of Arts and Crafts, Zagreb

References

External links

Modern Gallery official website 

Art museums and galleries in Zagreb
Zagreb
Donji grad, Zagreb
Art museums established in 1914
1914 establishments in Croatia
Neoclassical architecture in Croatia